General Carlos Humberto Romero Mena (29 February 1924 – 27 February 2017) was a Salvadoran army general politician who served as President of El Salvador from 1 July 1977, until his overthrow in a coup d'état on 15 October 1979.

Early life
Romero was born in Chalatenango, El Salvador, on 19 February 1924.

Military career

Romero studied at the Captain General Gerardo Barrios Military School and the Command and General Staff School. He did specialized horse riding studies in Mexico.

Romero was a member of the National Conciliation Party, and also served as Defense Minister from 1972 to 1977.

He launched his candidacy for the National Conciliation Party (PCN) in the February 1977 presidential elections. On 24 February, the Central Elections Council declared that he had won the election with 67.3% of the vote and was to be sworn in as President while Julio Ernesto Astacio was declared Vice President. The opposition forces grouped in the National Opposition Union (UNO) filed complaints about numerous acts of fraud and electoral coercion committed in the vote. The period between his election and the inauguration proved to be extremely dangerous for his opponents. On 28 February 1977, the military forces dissolved a UNO protest rally in the Plaza Libertad in San Salvador.

Presidency

General Romero was sworn in on 1 July 1977. He responded to accusations of "electoral fraud" by declaring a state of emergency for thirty days and established a rigidly conservative government. 

Romero's time in office was largely characterized by escalating violence and instability. In the late 1970s, political unrest increased, because of El Salvador's severe socio-economic inequalities unaddressed by his government and widespread discontent with government policy culminated in widespread protest and rebellion, which was met with reprisal by government forces. President Romero increased government education spending, but this won him no popularity with the left. The different police, military and government paramilitary forces launched a bloody repression campaign against leftist groups that ended the lives of 4 Catholic priests and numerous leaders and militants of workers and peasant organizations. He is accused of having ordered the student massacre of 30 July 1975. Left-wing armed groups responded to the violence exerted by the State with attacks on the security forces and government officials. The repression plunged the country into a serious social crisis.

1979 coup 
Romero held power until October 1979, when he was deposed with a reformist coup d'état by dissident, politically leftist and moderate military officers and civilians. The coup d'état that deposed Romero was preamble to El Salvador's twelve-year civil war.

Later life and death 

After being deposed, Romero lived in exile in Guatemala before returning to El Salvador. He died on 27 February 2017 at the age of 92 of natural causes.

Orders and decorations 

 Collar of the Order of Isabella the Catholic

References

|-

|-

|-

1924 births
2017 deaths
People from Chalatenango Department
Salvadoran expatriates in Mexico
Salvadoran expatriates in Guatemala
Salvadoran exiles
National Coalition Party (El Salvador) politicians
Presidents of El Salvador
Defence ministers of El Salvador
Leaders ousted by a coup
People of the Salvadoran Civil War
Salvadoran military personnel
Captain General Gerardo Barrios Military School alumni